The Manicure Girl is a 1925 American silent romantic drama film directed by Frank Tuttle and starring Bebe Daniels.

Plot
As described in a film magazine review, a poor young manicurist becomes engaged to a poor young man who has saved enough money to build a bungalow to live in after they are married. The young woman craves riches and becomes interested in a married man who treats her gentlemanly and kindly. This "other" man is becoming estranged from his wife. The manicurist realizes her own influence in wrecking the marriage and, in sympathy with the wife, she effects a reconciliation between the two. Her fiancé lover quarrels with her, but there is a happy ending when the two decide to hasten their marriage.

Cast

Preservation
With no prints of The Manicure Girl located in any film archives, it is a lost film.

References

External links

Lobby poster
Stills at silentfilmstillarchive.com

Lost American films
Films directed by Frank Tuttle
Paramount Pictures films
American silent feature films
American romantic drama films
1925 romantic drama films
American black-and-white films
1925 lost films
Lost romantic drama films
1920s English-language films
1920s American films
Silent romantic drama films
Silent American drama films